Royce Pauline Herron (born July 16, 1948) is an American actress and educator.  She is best known for her appearances on TV, for example in Mighty Morphin Power Rangers as Ms. Appleby, the Rangers' school teacher, but also acts in theater and film.  She has a Bachelor of Arts degree in oral communication from the University of Central Oklahoma and a master's degree in theatre from California State University, Los Angeles.

Herron teaches at Glendale Community College.
During over 20 years in arts administration  she worked for several organizations including the Army Music and Theater Program in Kaiserslautern, Germany, and the State Arts Council of Oklahoma.

TV appearances

Mighty Morphin Power Rangers
"For Whom the Bell Trolls" (September 15, 1993) - Ms. Appleby  
"Clean Up Club (November 23, 1993) - Ms. Appleby  
"Doomsday: Part 1" (November 29, 1993) - Ms. Appleby  
"Doomsday: Part 2" (November 30, 1993) - Ms. Appleby  
"Rita's Seed of Evil" (February 7, 1994) - Ms. Appleby  
"Reign of the Jellyfish" (February 17, 1994) - Ms. Appleby  
"Return of an Old Friend: Part 1" (February 28, 1994) - Ms. Appleby  
"Return of an Old Friend: Part 2" (March 1, 1994) - Ms. Appleby
"Grumble Bee" (April 28, 1994) - Ms. Appleby  
"Second Chance" (May 4, 1994) - Ms. Appleby  
"On Fins and Needles" (May 5, 1994) - Ms. Appleby  
"Mighty Morphin' Mutants" ( May 16, 1994) - Ms. Appleby  
"The Green Dream" (September 19, 1994) - Ms. Appleby  
"Where There's Smoke, There's Fire" (November 21, 1994) - Ms. Appleby
"Storybook Rangers: Part 2" (May 2, 1995) - Ms. Appleby

Power Rangers: Zeo
"For Cryin' Out Loud" (April 27, 1996) - Ms. Appleby  
"A Brief Mystery of Time" (November 11, 1996) - Ms. Appleby

Sweet Valley High
"Much Ado About Nachos" (Season three, August 26, 1996) - German Lady

Power Rangers Turbo
"Shift Into Turbo: Part 1" (April 19, 1997) - Ms. Appleby  
"Shift Into Turbo: Part 2" (April 26, 1997) - Ms. Appleby  
"Alarmed and Dangerous" (May 13, 1997) - Ms. Appleby

ER
"21 Guns" (May 18, 2006) - Sveta

Partial filmography
Rocky Road (Independent, director Geoff Cunningham)
Blue Ribbon (AFI)

External links

References

1948 births
American television actresses
California State University, Los Angeles alumni
Living people
People from Los Angeles
University of Central Oklahoma alumni
21st-century American women